Charlie, also known as Charlie the Curser is a female blue-and-yellow macaw who lived for decades in a garden centre in Reigate, Surrey, England.

Claimed association with Churchill

The owner claimed the parrot was that of Sir Winston Churchill while he was prime minister during World War II. He claims that his father-in-law sold the parrot to Churchill in 1937 and then reclaimed the bird shortly after Churchill's death in 1965. According to his stories, the vocal bird was taught by Churchill to shout curses at Nazi leader Adolf Hitler.

The claim is solidly rejected by the administrators of the Chartwell property, Churchill's former country home, who note only that he kept a grey parrot elsewhere. Further, Churchill's daughter, Lady Soames, has denied her father ever owned a macaw. She added he owned a grey parrot named Polly, but sold the bird before becoming Prime Minister. It is reported Charlie has been living at Heathfield Nurseries, where she is most frequently cared for by the establishment's manager, Sylvia Martin, who says that she's gotten slightly grumpy in her old age but is still a bright bird.

See also
 List of individual birds

Notes

References
 
 Hoffman, Bill. "Churchill's parrot still squawking at 104," New York Post. January 20, 2009, p. 7.
  "In A Flap Over 'Churchill's' Old Bird," Sky News. 20 January 2004.
 Lyall, Sarah.  "Reigate Journal; Parrot May Have Been Churchill's, but She's Not Saying," 'New York Times.'' March 9, 2004.
 "Winston's obscene parrot lives on," BBC News. 19 February 2004.
 

1899 animal births
Individual parrots
Individual animals in England